Francis Badgley (26 March 1767 – 7 October 1841) was a Canadian merchant, politician, and newspaper editor.

Early life
He was born in London, England and immigrated to Canada in about 1785.

Career
He lived in Montreal and, in 1788, entered a partnership with Richard Dobie who was active in the fur trade. This partnership lasted until 1792, when his diaries indicate that Badgley travelled to Grand Portage, Minnesota with the fur brigade and conducted a survey for the North West Company.

Badgley was elected to the Legislative Assembly of Lower Canada for Montreal East in 1800. This was a two-member riding and both he and Pierre-Louis Panet secured 178 votes. He was a supporter of the English party during his four years and did not run for re-election in 1804.

External links 
 
 
 

1767 births
1841 deaths
Canadian accountants
Canadian diarists
Canadian male journalists
Canadian newspaper editors
Members of the Legislative Assembly of Lower Canada
Pre-Confederation Canadian businesspeople
Anglophone Quebec people
English emigrants to pre-Confederation Quebec
Politicians from London